Richard Onslow may refer to:

Richard Onslow (Solicitor General) (1528–1571), Speaker of the House of Commons and Solicitor General
Richard Onslow (Parliamentarian) (1601–1664), Member of the Long Parliament and the Cromwellian House of Lords, grandson of the above
Richard Onslow, 1st Baron Onslow (1654–1717), Speaker of the House of Commons and Chancellor of the Exchequer, grandson of the above
Lt.-Gen. Richard Onslow (British Army officer) (died 1760), Governor of Fort William and Plymouth
Richard Onslow, 3rd Baron Onslow (1713–1776), Member of Parliament for Guildford and Lord Lieutenant of Surrey
Adm. Sir Richard Onslow, 1st Baronet (1741–1817), British naval leader distinguished at the Battle of Camperdown
Richard Onslow, 5th Earl of Onslow (1876–1945), diplomat, parliamentary secretary and government minister
Richard Onslow (Royal Navy officer) (1904–1975), British admiral
Richard Onslow (priest) (1776–1849), Archdeacon of Worcester